Bujagali–Tororo–Lessos High Voltage Power Line is a high voltage electricity power line, under construction, connecting the high voltage substation at Bujagali, in Uganda to another high voltage substation at Lessos, in Kenya.

Location
The power line starts at Bujagali Hydroelectric Power Station, in Jinja District, as a 220kV high voltage power line.

Overview
This power transmission line connects the electricity grid of Uganda to that of neighboring Kenya. It is in line with The Nile Equatorial Lakes Subsidiary Action Program (NELSAP), Interconnection of Electric Grids Project, led by Regional Manager, Grania Rubomboras.

The power line satisfies Uganda's need to export electricity to Kenya. It also satisfies Kenya's need to sell electricity to Uganda and the countries to the west of Kenya, including Rwanda, Burundi and the Democratic Republic of the Congo.

Construction in Uganda
The Bujagali–Kenya border section is jointly funded by (a) the government of Uganda (GoU), (b) the African Development Bank (AfDB), and (c) the Japan International Cooperation Agency (JICA).

Construction in Kenya
The Lessos–Uganda border section is jointly funded by the government of Kenya and the African Development Bank, at an initial cost of KSh2.3 billion. Construction is ongoing, with commercial commissioning, expected in December 2019.

See also
Energy in Uganda
Energy in Kenya
Masaka–Mutukula–Mwanza High Voltage Power Line

References

External links
Website of the Uganda Electricity Transmission Company Limited
Website of the Kenya Electricity Transmission Company
Locals await compensation over power lines

High-voltage transmission lines in Uganda
High-voltage transmission lines in Kenya
Energy infrastructure in Africa
Energy infrastructure in Kenya
Energy infrastructure in Uganda
Energy in Uganda
Energy in Kenya